Acromitostoma is a genus of harvestmen in the family Nemastomatidae with 2 described species from Spain.

Species
There are currently 2 described species in the genus Acromitostoma:

Acromitostoma hispanum (Roewer, 1917)  Andalusia, Spain
Acromitostoma rhinoceros (Roewer, 1917)  Andalusia, Spain, and Casablanca, Morocco

References

Harvestman genera
Arachnids of Europe